Scheming Schemers is a 1956 short subject directed by Jules White starring American slapstick comedy team The Three Stooges (Moe Howard, Larry Fine and Shemp Howard). It is the 173rd entry in the series released by Columbia Pictures starring the comedians, who released 190 shorts for the studio between 1934 and 1959.

Plot
The Stooges are novice plumbers, whose first job is finding a valuable ring that went down a drainpipe at the home of the wealthy Norfleets (Emil Sitka and Symona Boniface). The Stooges happily retrieve the ring, but Larry knocks it out of Moe's hand, and back it goes down the drain. The Stooges then work their way to basement to shut the water off. Larry is assigned to finding the water cutoff and proceeds to dig up most of the lawn. Shemp later surmises that the pipes fail to work properly because they are "clogged up with wires." Shemp and Moe proceed to remove the electrical system from the pipes and connect a water pipe to the newly available pipe. The cook (Dudley Dickerson), who is in the kitchen trying to prepare an extravagant meal for the Norfleets, watches in bewilderment as the stove and chandelier gush water.

As the Norfleet house transforms into Niagara Falls, two party guests named Mr. and Mrs. Allen (Kenneth MacDonald and Christine McIntyre) manage to swipe the prized Van Brocklin painting. Shemp heads for the upstairs bath to continue fixing the pipes, and Moe and Larry discover that the ring was stuck in Larry's hair the whole time. Mr. Norfleet is happy about his ring, but frantic that his painting was stolen. Moe and Larry see Allen hiding the painting in a pipe, and a pie fight ensues, extending to the other party guests. The Stooges manage to recover the painting, and Mr. Norfleet decides to reward them. Moe and Larry wonder where Shemp has been all this time. It turns out that he got himself stuck fixing the bathroom's pipes.

Cast

Credited
 Moe Howard as Moe
 Larry Fine as Larry
 Shemp Howard as Shemp (stock footage)
 Emil Sitka as Walter Norfleet
 Kenneth MacDonald as Mr. Allen
 Christine McIntyre as Mrs. Allen (stock footage)
 Dudley Dickerson as Chef (stock footage)

Uncredited
 Joe Palma as Shemp (new footage) (Face obstructed)
 Symona Boniface as Mrs. Norfleet (stock footage)
 Herbert Evans as Wilkes (stock footage)
 Victor Travers as sleeping Party guest (stock footage)
 Al Thompson as Party guest (stock footage)
 Judy Malcolm as Party guest (stock footage)

Production notes
Scheming Schemers is a remake of Vagabond Loafers, which in itself was a remake of A Plumbing We Will Go with former Stooge Curly Howard (who had died in January 1952); additional pie fight footage was borrowed from Half-Wits Holiday. This makes this the only Three Stooges short to use footage from three previous short subjects. Scheming Schemers was one of four shorts filmed in the wake of Shemp Howard's death using earlier footage and a stand-in. This film is also the last to contain new footage with long-time Stooges supporting actor Kenneth MacDonald.

"Fake Shemp"

As Shemp Howard had already died, for his last four films (Rumpus in the Harem, Hot Stuff, Scheming Schemers and Commotion on the Ocean), Columbia utilized supporting actor Joe Palma to be Shemp's double. Even though the last four shorts were remakes of earlier Shemp efforts, Palma's services were needed to film new scenes in order to link existing stock footage.

For Scheming Schemers, Palma appears for the shot of "Shemp" with his back to the camera, honking the horn of the Stooges' jeep. Palma then gathers several pipes, obstructing his face. Palma's one line of dialogue — "Hold yer horses, will ya?" — is Shemp's voice borrowed from the soundtrack of 1949's The Ghost Talks. This new footage was shot on January 16, 1956, only six weeks after Shemp's death.

See also
List of American films of 1956

References

External links 
 
 
Scheming Schemers at threestooges.net
What is a Fake Shemp?

1956 films
1956 comedy films
The Three Stooges films
American black-and-white films
The Three Stooges film remakes
Films directed by Jules White
Columbia Pictures short films
1950s English-language films
1950s American films
American comedy short films